The Kobe Challenger is a tennis tournament held near Kobe, Japan in Miki at the Beans Dome in Miki Disaster Management Park, since 2015. The event is part of the ATP Challenger Tour and is played on indoor hard courts.

Past finals

Singles

Doubles

External links 
 
ITF Search

 
Tennis tournaments in Japan
Hard court tennis tournaments
ATP Challenger Tour
Sport in Kobe
Recurring sporting events established in 2015